Pilluni (Aymara, hispanicized spellings Pelloni, Pillone, Pillune, Pilloni) may refer to:

 Pilluni (Apurímac-Cusco), a mountain on the border of the Apurímac Region and the Cusco Region, Peru 
 Pilluni (Castilla), a mountain in the Castilla Province, Arequipa Region, Peru
 Pilluni (La Unión), a mountain in the La Unión Province, Arequipa Region, Peru

See also
 Beatrice Pelloni (born 1962), Italian mathematician